Odontoscirus is a genus of snout mites in the family Bdellidae.

Species 
Odontoscirus contains the following species:

 Odontoscirus affinis (Atyeo, 1963)
 Odontoscirus agrestis (Atyeo, 1963)
 Odontoscirus alacris (Atyeo, 1963)
 Odontoscirus alpinus Atyeo, 1960
 Odontoscirus amamiensis Shiba, 1985
 Odontoscirus ancalae (Atyeo, 1963)
 Odontoscirus angustifolius (Gupta, 1991)
 Odontoscirus annona (Tseng, 1978
 Odontoscirus asiaticus Kuznetsov & Barilo, 1984
 Odontoscirus atro (Gupta, 1991)
 Odontoscirus Atyeoi Michocka, 1987
 Odontoscirus augusta (Roy & Saha, 2010)
 Odontoscirus australicus (Womersley, 1933)
 Odontoscirus bidentata (Wallace & Mahon, 1976)
 Odontoscirus bifurcata (El-Sherif & Bolland, 1993)
 Odontoscirus bisetosa (Atyeo, 1960)
 Odontoscirus brevicornis (Cooremann, 1959)
 Odontoscirus bryi (Atyeo, 1963)
 Odontoscirus californica (Banks, 1904)
 Odontoscirus camellae (Atyeo, 1963)
 Odontoscirus communis (Atyeo, 1960)
 Odontoscirus conformis (Atyeo, 1963)
 Odontoscirus consanguinea (Atyeo, 1963)
 Odontoscirus copiosa (Atyeo, 1963)
 Odontoscirus currax (Atyeo, 1963)
 Odontoscirus curvus (Atyeo, 1963)
 Odontoscirus denheyeri Eghbalian, Khanjani and Ueckermann, 2017
 Odontoscirus dubitatus (Womersley, 1933)
 Odontoscirus edentata (Halliday, 2005)
 Odontoscirus exilicornis (Berlese, 1910)
 Odontoscirus flexuosa (Atyeo, 1963)
 Odontoscirus furcatus (Shiba, 1969)
 Odontoscirus georgianensis (Wallace, 1970)
 Odontoscirus graminis (Wallace & Mahon, 1976)
 Odontoscirus grandiflora (Gupta, 1991)
 Odontoscirus gressitti (Atyeo, 1964)
 Odontoscirus guajavae (Chatterjee & Gupta, 2002)
 Odontoscirus hadroseta (Wallace & Mahon, 1976)
 Odontoscirus haramotoi (Swift & Goff, 1987)
 Odontoscirus harpax (Atyeo, 1963)
 Odontoscirus hessei (Womersley, 1933)
 Odontoscirus hickmani (Womersley, 1933)
 Odontoscirus hospita (Banks, 1916)
 Odontoscirus hurdi (Atyeo, 1960)
 Odontoscirus hygrotes (Swift & Goff, 1987)
 Odontoscirus inflata (Wallace & Mahon, 1976)
 Odontoscirus infrequens (Atyeo, 1960)
 Odontoscirus insolita (Atyeo, 1960)
 Odontoscirus intermedius (Thor, 1928)
 Odontoscirus intricata (Atyeo, 1963)
 Odontoscirus iota Atyeo, 1960
 Odontoscirus iraniensis (Ueckermann, Rastegar, Saboori & Ostovan, 2007)
 Odontoscirus japonicus (Ehara, 1961)
 Odontoscirus kazeruni (Ostovan & Kamali, 1995)
 Odontoscirus koloseta (Wallace & Mahon, 1976)
 Odontoscirus lapidaria (Kramer, 1881)
 Odontoscirus livistonana Ali Khan & Anwarullah, 1970
 Odontoscirus longirostris (Hermann, 1804)
 Odontoscirus macquariensis (Atyeo, 1963)
 Odontoscirus malayensis Shiba, 1978
 Odontoscirus manipurensis (Gupta, 1991)
 Odontoscirus meridionalis (Thor, 1931)
 Odontoscirus montanus (Kuznetsov & Barilo, 1984)
 Odontoscirus multicia (Atyeo, 1963)
 Odontoscirus nimia (Atyeo, 1963)
 Odontoscirus nipponicus Shiba, 1985
 Odontoscirus odonata (Wallace & Mahon, 1976)
 Odontoscirus oraria (Atyeo, 1963)
 Odontoscirus pacifica (Atyeo, 1963)
 Odontoscirus paganus (Atyeo, 1963)
 Odontoscirus parvisetosa (Atyeo, 1977)
 Odontoscirus petila (Atyeo, 1963)
 Odontoscirus pilahensis (Shiba, 1978
 Odontoscirus porrectus (Kramer, 1898)
 Odontoscirus procincta (Atyeo, 1963)
 Odontoscirus quadrisetosa (Atyeo, 1977)
 Odontoscirus raeticus (Schweizer & Bader, 1963)
 Odontoscirus reticulata (Atyeo, 1960)
 Odontoscirus rhachia (Wallace, 1970)
 Odontoscirus sabulosa (Wallace & Mahon, 1976)
 Odontoscirus simplex (Atyeo, 1960)
 Odontoscirus spinosa (Atyeo, 1960)
 Odontoscirus serpentinus (Atyeo, 1963)
 Odontoscirus subterranea (Cooremann, 1959)
 Odontoscirus tanta (Atyeo, 1963)
 Odontoscirus tasmaniensis (Wallace & Mahon, 1976)
 Odontoscirus tellustris (Atyeo, 1963)
 Odontoscirus truncata (Atyeo, 1960)
 Odontoscirus vireti (Atyeo, 1963)
 Odontoscirus virgulata (Canestrini & Fanzago, 1877)
 Odontoscirus watsoni (Atyeo, 1963)
 Odontoscirus womersleyi (Atyeo, 1963)

References 

Trombidiformes genera